Grandilithus is a genus of araneomorph spiders in the family Phrurolithidae. It was first described by Liu & Li in 2022.

Species 
 it contains thirty species:

 Grandilithus anyuan Liu & S. Q. Li, 2022 (type) — China
 Grandilithus aobei Liu & S. Q. Li, 2022 — China
 Grandilithus bawangling (Fu, Zhang & Zhu, 2010) — China (Hainan)
 Grandilithus biarclatus (Fu, He & Zhang, 2015) — China (Hainan)
 Grandilithus dingnan Liu & S. Q. Li, 2022 — China
 Grandilithus dongguling Liu & S. Q. Li, 2022 — China
 Grandilithus ensifer (Mu & Zhang, 2021) — China
 Grandilithus fengshan Liu & S. Q. Li, 2022 — China
 Grandilithus florifer (Fu, He & Zhang, 2015) — China (Hainan)
 Grandilithus fujianus (Fu, Jin & Zhang, 2014) — China
 Grandilithus jianfengling (Fu, Zhang & Zhu, 2010) — China (Hainan)
 Grandilithus jiangshan Liu & S. Q. Li, 2022 — China
 Grandilithus jingshi Liu & S. Q. Li, 2022 — China
 Grandilithus limushan (Fu, Zhang & Zhu, 2010) — China (Hainan)
 Grandilithus linglingae Lin & Li, 2023 — Vietnam
 Grandilithus longjiatang Liu & S. Q. Li, 2022 — China
 Grandilithus longtanica (Liu, 2020) — China
 Grandilithus lynx (Kamura, 1994) — Taiwan, Japan (Ryukyu Is.)
 Grandilithus nanan Liu & S. Q. Li, 2022 — China
 Grandilithus ningdu Liu & S. Q. Li, 2022 — China
 Grandilithus nonggang (Liu, Xu, Xiao, Yin & Peng, 2019) — China
 Grandilithus taihe Liu & S. Q. Li, 2022 — China
 Grandilithus taiwanicus (Hayashi & Yoshida, 1993) — China, Taiwan, Japan
 Grandilithus tianyushan Liu & S. Q. Li, 2022 — China
 Grandilithus tupingao Liu & S. Q. Li, 2022 — China
 Grandilithus wanshou (Yin, 2012) — China
 Grandilithus wanzili Liu & S. Q. Li, 2022 — China
 Grandilithus xiaoxiicus (Liu, 2020) — China
 Grandilithus yangzhi Lin & Li, 2023 — Vietnam
 Grandilithus yunyin Liu & S. Q. Li, 2022 — China

References 

Phrurolithidae genera
Spiders of Asia
Phrurolithidae